The 2012 season was the San Diego Chargers' 43rd in the National Football League, their 53rd overall and their sixth and final season under head coach Norv Turner. The Chargers failed to improve on their 8–8 record from 2011 and missed the playoffs for a third consecutive season, resulting in Turner's firing on December 31, 2012. This was also the Chargers' first losing season since 2003 and the first losing season in the Philip Rivers era.

Offseason

Signings

Departures

2012 draft class

Draft notes

Staff

Final roster

Schedule

Preseason

Regular season

Note: Intra-division opponents are in bold text.

Game summaries

Week 1: at Oakland Raiders

The Chargers (1–0) won their season opener 22–14 against the Oakland Raiders after five field goals by Nate Kaeding and three botched punts by the Raiders. The Raiders Pro Bowl long snapper Jon Condo suffered a head injury in the second quarter. He was replaced by linebacker Travis Goethel, who had not snapped since high school. Goethel rolled two snaps to punter Shane Lechler, each giving the Chargers the ball in Raiders territory, and Lechler had another punt blocked by Dante Rosario. The Chargers scored their only touchdown in the second quarter after a 13-play, 90-yard drive resulted in a 6-yard touchdown pass from Philip Rivers to wide receiver Malcom Floyd. The Chargers failed to score four out of five times in the red zone.

San Diego led at halftime 10–6, and the Raiders did not scored a touchdown until 54 seconds remained in the game. Undrafted rookie Mike Harris made his first NFL start, filing in for left tackle for an injured Jared Gaither. San Diego protected Harris by having Rivers throw short passes; sixteen of Rivers' 24 completions were to running backs and tight ends, and he threw for 231 yards while only being sacked once. He did not have an interception after throwing 20 in 2011.

The win was the Chargers' eighth in their previous nine games at Oakland. It improved Norv Turner's record to 4–2 in Chargers' season openers. Running back Ryan Mathews and receiver Vincent Brown missed the game with injuries.

Week 2: vs. Tennessee Titans

With the win, the Chargers improved to 2–0 and started with such a record for the first time since 2006.

Week 3: vs. Atlanta Falcons

The Chargers lost 27–3 to the Atlanta Falcons, who remained one of three undefeated teams in the league.  Rivers had one of his worst statistical performances, completing 21 of 38 passes for 173 yards, with two interceptions and a passer rating of 45.2. Running back Ryan Matthews made his season debut, and ran for 44 yards on 10 carries. However, he had a fumble inside the Falcons' 5-yard line. The Chargers had four turnovers to the Atlanta's one. The Chargers had not been held to three points since a 30–3 loss at Miami during the 2002 season. The Falcons improved to a perfect 3–0 all-time record in San Diego while the Chargers dropped to 2–1 on the season while suffering a television blackout in Southern California.

Week 4: at Kansas City Chiefs

The Chargers defeated the Kansas City Chiefs 37–20 and started the season with a 3–1 record for the second consecutive year.  San Diego forced the Chiefs into six turnovers, and they led 20–0 in the second quarter. Rivers completed 18 of 23 passes for 209 yards and two touchdown passes, but threw one interception in the red zone. Jackie Battle started at running back instead of Mathews. Battle was in 27 plays compared to Mathews' 21, and he had 15 carries for 39 yards with a team-high four catches for 42 yards. Most of Mathews work was in the fourth quarter when San Diego's victory was mostly already decided. U-T San Diego wrote that Mathews would have been expected to start were it not for his fumble against Atlanta the prior week. Nick Novak filled in for kicker Nate Kaeding, who was out with a groin injury, and made all three of his field goals.

Week 5: at New Orleans Saints

San Diego led 24–14 in the third quarter before the New Orleans Saints rallied for a 31–24 victory. The Chargers' Melvin Ingram was called for roughing the passer, nullifying a Drew Brees interception returned for a touchdown that would have put the Chargers ahead 31–14. Rivers had two costly turnovers in the fourth quarter: an interception that led to a Saints field goal and a fumble as San Diego was driving to tie the score in the game's last minute.

With the loss, San Diego missed an opportunity to take a two-game lead over the Denver Broncos for the AFC West. The Chargers dropped to 3–2 while the Saints would get their first win of the season and improve to 1–4.

Brees, a former Charger, broke an NFL record with his 48th straight game with a touchdown pass. He finished with 370 yards and four touchdown passes. Rivers threw for 354 yards and two touchdowns, both to former Saint Robert Meachem; they were Meachem's first touchdowns of the season.

Week 6: vs. Denver Broncos

The Chargers lost 35–24 to the Denver Broncos after leading 24–0 at halftime. The loss tied San Diego with Denver for the AFC West lead with a 3–3 record. Rivers had a career-high six turnovers, five in the second half. One of his interceptions and one of his fumbles were returned by the Broncos for touchdowns. He had four interceptions, including three in the fourth quarter.

The Chargers built their first-half lead after two special teams fumble recoveries and an 80-yard touchdown return by Quentin Jammer off a Peyton Manning interception. It was the first score of Jammer's career. Rivers also threw two touchdowns to Antonio Gates in the first half.

After the game, Fox Sports insider Jay Glazer reported that the Chargers used an "illegal stickum-type substance" during the game, and a Chargers equipment member was caught by the line judge hiding and handing out the substance to players, which was confiscated by the league. Chargers head coach Norv Turner denied that the team cheated, and stated that the object was a towel with a substance that dries footballs. The product was later identified as Gorilla Gold Grip Enhancer. On November 7, the league stated that the Chargers did not cheat, but fined the team $20,000.

Week 8: at Cleveland Browns

San Diego (3–4) lost their third straight game, 7–6 on the road to the Cleveland Browns (2–6). After blowing second-half leads the past two games in consecutive losses, the Chargers never led in this game. Rivers was 18 of 34 for 154 yards, but had a touchdown pass dropped by Meachem in the third quarter. With the Chargers forced to run because of the bad weather, Mathews ran 24 times for 95 yards. The Browns' Trent Richardson ran for 122 yards and a touchdown. It was the second game of the year the Chargers did not score an offensive touchdown. The last time San Diego failed to score a touchdown in two or more games was in 2000, when it occurred three times.

With the Broncos' win that same week, the Chargers fell into a second place tie with the Raiders in the AFC West.

Week 9: vs. Kansas City Chiefs

The Chargers (4–4) won 31–13 in a home game against Kansas City (1–7), their second win in the season against the Chiefs. San Diego's defense scored two touchdowns, and Rivers completed  90% (18–20) of his passes, the fifth highest completion percentage in NFL history.  Rivers threw a touchdown to Gates in the opening drive of the game, and threw another to Floyd in the fourth quarter. The defense followed with Jarret Johnson's sack of the Chiefs' Matt Cassel, which caused a fumble that was recovered by Shaun Phillips for a San Diego touchdown. On the next drive, Demorrio Williams intercepted Cassel's pass and returned it for a 59-yard touchdown.

Rivers threw for 220 yards, but had an interception in the red zone to end the first half. Danario Alexander started at wide receiver for an injured Meachem, and receiver Eddie Royal also sat out the game. Nose tackle Antonio Garay played his first game of the year. Some fans at halftime held a sign that read "Mr. Spanos, please fire A.J. & Norv." Team president Dean Spanos in January had decided to bring back coach Norv Turner and general manager A.J. Smith despite having won only three  playoff games in five seasons (first year 2007), failing to qualify in the previous two season. Norv had a 3–3 playoff record with the Chargers between 2007 and 2009, the only years the Chargers made the playoffs during Norvs tenure.

Week 10: at Tampa Bay Buccaneers

San Diego (4–5) lost 34–24 to the Tampa Bay Buccaneers (5–4), dropping the Chargers two games behind division-leading Denver. The Chargers allowed touchdowns off a blocked punt and an interception after they led 21–17 at halftime. They had three touchdowns off 80-yard drives in the first half, when Rivers threw three touchdown while completing 16 of 18 passes for 218 yards and no interceptions. However, he three two interceptions in the fourth quarter, including one that was returned 83 yards for a touchdown that he threw heading out of bounds to avoid a sack.

Alexander had five receptions for 134 yards, including an 80-yard touchdown. Vincent Jackson, who left the Chargers as a free agent for Tampa Bay, had five receptions for 59 yards in his first game against San Diego.

Week 11: at Denver Broncos

The Chargers (4–6) fell three games behind Denver (7–3) for the division lead after losing to them, 30–23. Denver linebacker Von Miller had three sacks and forced two fumbles as the defense rattled Rivers. "This is the best defensive team they've had since I've been playing them," said Rivers.

The Chargers offense was shut out in the first half. Their first 12 possessions resulted in 10 punts and two turnovers. Rivers was 9-for-20 for 60 yards and an interception, and the running game had only 8 yards on 11 attempts. The Chargers first 9 points of the game were scored by the defense—an interception returned for a touchdown by Eric Weddle, and a safety by Shaun Phillips. Rivers threw for 198 of his 258 yards in the second half while throwing two touchdowns. Manning finished the game with 270 yards and three touchdown for Denver.

Denver swept the season series against the Chargers, giving them the advantage in a tiebreaker with San Diego if needed. "They're not losing four of six, I can guarantee you that", Rivers said in conceding the division. He was part of the 2008 team that trailed Denver by three games with three remaining before winning the division as the Broncos collapsed.

Week 12: vs. Baltimore Ravens

San Diego (4–7) led 13–3 with 7:51 remaining in the game before losing 16–13 in overtime to the Baltimore Ravens (9–2). The Ravens faced fourth-and-29 at their own 37 with 1:37 left when running back Ray Rice caught a pass one yard past the line of scrimmage. He ran to the 50-yard line, where he made three Chargers miss with a 90-degree cut to his left. Rice gained the 29 yards needed for a first down after escaping safety Eric Weddle, who received a concussion on the play as he was blocked by wide receiver Anquan Boldin. The Ravens kicked a 38-yard field goal to tie the game at the end of regulation, and made another 38-yarder to win with 1:07 left in overtime.

Rivers threw a 21-yard touchdown to Floyd and Novak kicked two field goals for the Chargers' scores. Rivers was sacked six times, but did not have a turnover for only the third time in 11 games; he entered the contest with 14 interceptions and four lost fumbles. The Ravens' fourth-and-29 was the longest fourth-down conversion in the NFL since 2001. It was the third time the Chargers blew a double-digit lead in the second half, including the earlier back-to-back losses to the Saints and Broncos. After being 8–0 under Turner in November from 2009 to 2010, San Diego fell to 1–7, the second-worst November record in the league since 2011.

Week 13: vs. Cincinnati Bengals

The Cincinnati Bengals (7–5) scored the go-ahead touchdown with 4:51 remaining in the game and defeated the Chargers (4–8), 20–13. San Diego surrendered 10 points in the final five minutes of regulation for the second consecutive week, and they lost for the fourth straight week and seventh time in eight games. The Chargers dropped to 0–5 in games decided by seven points or fewer. It was their fourth loss in a game when holding a fourth-quarter lead.

Williams intercepted Bengals quarterback Andy Dalton and returned it for a 31-yard touchdown, his second score of the season. Rivers had two turnovers in the final 3:54. A fumble set up a field goal for the Bengals, and he threw an interception on fourth-and-10 from Cincinnati's 17 with 49 seconds remaining. The Chargers' offense was held without a touchdown for the third time in the season.

The Chargers' home crowd of 54,980 was their lowest since 2004. It was their second straight blackout and third of the season. Meachem did not have a pass thrown to him for the second straight week; it was his fifth game without a catch.

Week 14: at Pittsburgh Steelers

With a surprising road victory over the Steelers to save their playoff hopes after losing four straight games, the Chargers improved to 5–8 on the season and 1–14 all-time in Pittsburgh during the regular season. The Steelers became the only AFC North team that San Diego would defeat this season.

Week 15: vs. Carolina Panthers

With the loss, the Chargers fell to 5–9 and were officially eliminated from playoff contention for the third-straight year. The Chargers' home crowd of 53,832 was their lowest since 2004. It was their third-straight blackout at home and fourth of the season. San Diego's home finale against the Raiders sold out, thus ending the home blackout streak. The team finished the season 0–4 against NFC opponents and had their first losing season since 2003.

Week 16: at New York Jets

Week 17: vs. Oakland Raiders

Standings

References

External links
 
 2012 San Diego Chargers at pro-football-reference.com

San Diego
San Diego Chargers seasons
San Diego